, also known as Hatsukoi Limited, is a Japanese shōnen romantic comedy manga by Mizuki Kawashita. It was serialized by Shueisha in the manga magazine Weekly Shōnen Jump from October 2007 to May 2008 and collected in four bound volumes. The series depicts vignettes in the love lives of eight girls in middle school and high school.

A drama CD adaptation was released in February 2009, and a light novel in March 2009. An anime adaptation produced by J.C.Staff was broadcast in twelve episodes in Japan from April 11 to June 27, 2009.

Plot 
The manga features a series of short stories about eight girls in middle school and high school, plus their classmates and relatives. Each chapter focuses on a different main character. These stories are intertwined and eventually lead to a main story involving most of the cast. A series relating the intertwined stories about the "first loves" of several middle-schoolers and high-schoolers. Each episode tends to focus on a different character, however the developments established during previous episodes continue to play smaller roles in those following. As the series progresses, an array of unusual and unexpected love webs begin to blossom.

Characters

Middle school students 

 A second year in middle school and the focus of Chapter 1 where she is one day asked out by Misao Zaitsu. Though she claims she would accept any offer, she is consistently unsettled by Misao's monstrous appearance. However, she shows she can be somewhat caring as well as crafty. She has a crush with Misao's younger brother Mamoru after he carries her to the infirmary in the manner that she dreams of: carried like a princess by a prince. At the end of the anime, she tries to decide between the two Zaitsu brothers, whether to choose the one who likes her (Misao) or the one she likes (Mamoru). In the Manga, she rejects Misao and tells him she does not want to give up just yet on her first love.

 One of Ayumi's classmates and friends, Kei is apparently very popular with guys due to her earlier developed body and "mature" face. However, she sees the attention she receives as a hassle, and believes confessions of love are just a chore if the feeling is not mutual. She openly admits that looks are a major factor when starting a relationship, but carries a love-hate (mostly hate) relationship with Etsu Kusuda. Because of this belief, she denies any attraction to him, even to herself. But when he confesses his feelings to her, she returned them, and at the end of the series she totally reversed her way of thinking--looks are no longer a major factor to start a relationship but inner beauty--surprising everyone, especially Rika, saying that it sounds like a joke from her.

 Another one of Ayumi's friends and classmates, Koyoi has an open brother complex with her brother Yoshihiko, which stresses him a lot. For a while when Misao started hanging around, she, along with Nao Chikura, stops walking home with Ayumi. Since her brother likes Misaki, a popular and attractive girl, she regards her as a "Final Boss" that she must defeat. She also quotes that Misaki's chest is a "truly evil power."

 Seemingly the most level-headed of the group, Rika (or Doba-chan to her closest friends) seems to enjoy teasing others. A well known tomboy, she excels in athletics and has been stated to be domineering. She is in the same grade as Ayumi. She became close to tennis player Haruto Terai when he started physical training with her, and over time became attracted to him, but did not give him that impression at first, thinking that was all there was to have a relationship. However, after Kei explained to her about what boys think and feel, Rika became more overt about her feelings, and surprised Haruto with a kiss, and furthermore, after the runaway incident by some of the boys, she admits that if Haruto also ran away, she "absolutely will not like it".

 Another of Ayumi's friends and classmates, Nao is somewhat envious of the attention Kei is getting. Along with Koyoi, she, for a while, stops walking home with Ayumi for fear of Misao. Being a member of the art club, she comes to admire the artist who made the painting of a Sakura tree, Renjou Yukito, and after meeting him, she asked him to assist her in her painting. However, upon his graduation, he left Japan, leaving her broken-hearted. When she learns of Hiroyuki Sogabe's feelings towards her, she became close to him. But it is hinted that she still holds strong feelings towards Yukito at the end of the series and it is stated by the author herself that whether Chikura has chosen Sogabe over Yukito or retain her feelings for Yukito has become an unsolved mystery.

A cheerful boy who dreams of becoming a paramedic, Ayumi falls for Mamoru quickly when he offers to take her to the nurse. Although he is in Ayumi's class, Ayumi only realizes that he is in fact Misao's younger brother a day after she meets Misao. He is somewhat taken back by Ayumi; he believes she is more fearsome than she may appear. Furthermore, despite Ayumi's feelings, Mamoru has a crush on his next door neighbor Misaki Yamamoto. Misaki sees Mamoru more as a little brother than anything else. He later runs away with Kusuda and Sogabe after Misaki turns her down. He later has a change of heart after realizing he made Ayumi cry due to his actions.

 Etsu is an unattractive, short, quite dense and perverted friend of Mamoru's. He has a talent of putting girls to sleep with lame puns. He does not see much in Ayumi (though he wanted to see her in a cheerleader outfit), but he is very interested in Misaki--he is nearly obsessed with her.  He seems undaunted by Kei's good looks, and with his "Kappa-like" face, they tend to bicker a lot. It is clear that he has more feelings for Kei than he lets on. He runs away from home with Mamoru and Sogabe because he regrets saying he hates Kei. In the end, he confesses to Kei and finds his feelings reciprocated.

A member of the tennis club at school, Terai has little athletic ability.  However, with Dobashi's assistance, he manages to become a somewhat decent athlete.  During that time, he has fallen for Dobashi, but due to her (inadvertent) teasing, plus the fact that she avoided holding hands with him (to which she revealed that she found it embarrassing to do so), he is unsure of their relationship. Eventually, he gets a kiss from Dobashi, which affirms their relationship.

 A friend of Kusuda, Hiroyuki is a bit of a delusional character, as well as a little narcissistic. He likes Nao and tries to get close to her to create an opportunity for her to confess to him.  He shows his insecurities when Nao shows interest towards Yukito Renjou, an artist and graduated student from their school. He runs away from home because of this (although only for two days) with Kusuda and Mamoru. After he loudly conveys his feelings towards Nao such that she hears it (after she and the other girls pursue the runaways), the two become close. Near the end of the series, he cuts his hair in order to clean himself up.

 
 A second year middle school student, Soako is the heroine of the four-part Omake at the end of each printed volume of Hatsukoi Limited. The first introduction of Soako is when she is late for school. Unfortunately for Soako, in her lateness, she has forgotten to put on underwear. The story follows her throughout the day, and all the problems that she has. She is, however, helped by Mamoru at the end of the last omake chapter, which makes her fall for him (to Ayumi's dismay).

A middle school student who is the head of the Theatre Club. She is determined on producing the best stage-performance since her taking the position. She has hers sights set on making Kusuda join the production due to his kappa-like looks and will resort to any means necessary (her large breasts) to achieve it.

High school students 

 With a monstrous face and a huge body, Misao is feared by anyone who sees his face or knows his name (with the exception of his childhood friend and neighbor, Misaki Yamamoto). As expected, he is a capable fighter with plenty of enemies.  However, he is also unexpectedly shy; being unable to convey his feelings through words, he writes his confession on a note, and he is unable to bring himself to even say Ayumi's name.  He fell for Ayumi when he saw her picture while looking through his brother's class photos. After Ayumi made him realize that he scares her, he decided to watch over her at a distance. At the end when Ayumi realizes his good intentions, she tells him her "answer", that she will need to decide between him and his brother Mamoru. Misao understands this, and also decides Mamoru is his rival. He is a stark 194cm (6'4") tall. He seems to be similar to Migishima, another character from Ichigo 100%, due to his intimidating presence despite his good intentions.

 Yuuji is Ayumi's older brother. He can be described as somewhat callous and rude.  For example, he steals her cookies (even gives them a rating, given Ayumi's poor cooking and baking) and barges into her room without knocking. The reason for his behavior may stem from his sister complex, which he is not very proud of. Like all other guys at his school, he cowers at hearing the name of Misao Zaitsu, and is mortified at the idea that his sister has fallen for Misao. When Misaki Yamamoto starts to show interest in him, he is at first puzzled as to why someone like herself would like someone like him. After some resistance, they seem to be together near the end.

 A first year in high school, Misaki is close friends with Meguru and Yuu, as well as the next door neighbor and childhood friend of the Zaitsu brothers. Misaki ("Saki" for short) is a teenage girl who is rather tall for her age (she ranks as among the three tallest of the female characters) and is notable for having a well-endowed body, and is highly sought after by the boys around her (with the exception of Yuuji Arihara.) She has a very open relationship with her neighbors. She even comes into Mamoru's room through his window, and appears to be the only character in the series who's not afraid of Misao (mostly due to having grown up together). She somehow knows and is very proficient with wrestling, and can perform submissions instinctively in her sleep; in the anime, she was seen executing some on a hesitant Misao to get some answers out of him. She even has a penchant for loudly declaring the name of her wrestling moves as she performs them. In the manga, she is revealed to be a K-1 fan. Though she claimed she had no interest in relationships at the moment, she developed an interest for Yuuji Arihara when he shoved a lollipop in her mouth (showing an example to his friend, Yoshihiko Bessho). But although she likes Yuuji, she is not used to feeling vulnerable around boys, because she's usually cool and level headed. When Yuuji begins to express his interest in her (In the same way she did to him), it makes her shy and unsettled, so she tells Arihara to leave her alone. He later explains that love is about letting people see your other sides as well, not just your tough side. They seem to be dating after the series end. It was also revealed that being an only child, she's quite envious at those who have siblings, and thus, as part of her attraction to Yuuji, she also takes a liking to his younger sister Ayumi, treating her as a younger sister of her own.

 The focus of Chapter 3. Yuu is Kei's older sister, and is also good friends with Meguru and Misaki. She is a cheerful girl who never hesitates to make friends.  Although she appears to be somewhat air-headed, she carries an avid interest for just about everything, making her very knowledgeable on a variety of subjects. As a result, she, like her sister, garners a lot of attention from many guys. However, whether its being oblivious or just nonchalant, she doesn't seem to mind being friendly with all of them. She also looks younger than her own younger sister, but that is due to her smaller frame and more innocent personality.

 
 Meguru is a close friend of both Misaki and Yuu.  In middle school, she was a national champion in swimming, making her a reserve candidate for the Olympics.  However, Meguru quits swimming when she enters high school because she becomes conscious of her breasts growing too large and attracting too much attention. As a result she wears small bras in attempt to make her breasts look smaller. Her friends encourage her to not be ashamed of them, and not hiding them. Fortunately, those who are openly attracted to her large breasts does not include Gengorou Takei, whom Meguru secretly likes. She eventually joins the school swimming team, at first to save the team from closure (because it had only five members and one of them quit) and taking the position as team manager, and, after some prodding from Takei, eventually as one of the swimmers.

A classmate of Misaki and Yuu, he has dreamed of being a manga artist since he was 5 years old.  He decides to use Yuu as the model for a story he is thinking up, and Yuu inadvertently becomes the first one to find out about his passion.  He receives a lot of support from Yuu, and eventually becomes more interested on becoming her boyfriend than writing manga.  Still, he is faced by the challenges he face with manga, as well as the competition for Yuu's attention.

 A first year in high school, Yoshihiko is Koyoi's older brother, with whom she is smitten.  However, he does not return her level of affection, and is often annoyed by it. He is in love with Misaki, whom, to his dismay, likes his best friend Arihara, but they are in friendly terms such that she often confides in him about Arihara.

Nao's older brother, he is classmates with Yoshihiko and Yuuji. He never really gets much focus, but it appears he is somewhat popular with the ladies. To his dismay, all three of their younger sisters are coincidentally friends, and usually get in trouble together.

 He is Meguru's upperclassman who tries to persuade her to join the swimming club at every opportunity.  He challenged Meguru to a backstroke contest (to persuade her to join the team) and loses. Takei was Meguru's childhood friend - it is mentioned that they've taken swimming lessons together since they were children. He finally succeeds in getting Meguru to join the swimming club as a star player after he admits to liking her as a girl rather than merely as a champion swimmer.

An artist, whom drew the Sakura painting which Nao is inspired at. He used to attend the middle school which Nao goes to. Presently, he goes to a prestigious high school called Kaitei High School and is in his graduating year. He became close to Nao after she finds out he made the painting she often looked at. Upon his graduation though, he left Japan without telling Nao--he only left a letter thanking her for the support she gave him on his dream of volunteer work and painted her in the painting they were working on.

 A first year in high school, and Meguru's self-proclaimed rival in swimming since middle school. She shows up to challenge Meguru to a swimming race and beats her, making Meguru unsure of herself, and is also influential in getting her back into swimming. Her small stature makes people think she is a primary school student. Meguru calls her Kyu-chan, a nickname Nanoka hates.

Media

Manga 
Hatsukoi Limited was serialized by Shueisha in the Japanese shōnen manga magazine Weekly Shōnen Jump from October 1, 2007 to May 26, 2008. The 32 chapters were collected in four bound volumes. Each chapter is a separate story following one or more of the eight main characters. The series is licensed in Hong Kong by CultureCom Comics, in Taiwan by Tong Li Publishing and in Italy by Star Comics.

Drama CD 
A drama CD adaptation was released by Shueisha on 16 February 2009.

Light novel 
A light novel adaptation written by Sawako Hirabayasi called  was published by Shueisha on 23 March 2009.

Anime 

The anime television series adaptation was produced by J.C.Staff, written by Mariko Kunisawa, and directed by Yoshiki Yamakawa, with character designs by Tomoyuki Shitaya. The opening theme is "Future Stream" by sphere, and the ending theme is "Hatsukoi Limited" by marble. The series debuted on April 11, 2009 on in Japan on BS11, and completed on June 27, 2009 with the twelfth episode.

Reception 
The first volume of First Love Limited reached number 10 on the Tohan list of best-selling manga in the week it was released.

The opening episode was rated 4 out of 5 by Anime News Network's Theron Martin, who described it as "surprisingly funny and even occasionally sweet" despite "a typical set-up and an overused plot device." Carlo Santos rated the episode 2.5 out of 5, saying "this would be a lot more appealing if the plot weren't so cut-and-dried and the characters weren't so transparent,". Carl Kimlinger gave it 3 ½, citing the episode's sensitivity to the character's emotions and that the "female cast is downright delectable, the fan-service lovingly animated, and the overall look realistic."

References

External links 
 Official Shueisha webpage 
 Anime official website (archive) 
 Official drama CD webpage 
 

2007 manga
2009 Japanese novels
2009 Japanese television series debuts
2009 Japanese television series endings
J.C.Staff
NBCUniversal Entertainment Japan
Romantic comedy anime and manga
Shōnen manga
Shueisha manga
Sentai Filmworks
Light novels
Anime series